Hyperphosphorylation occurs when a biochemical with multiple phosphorylation sites is fully saturated. Hyperphosphorylation is one of the signaling mechanisms used by the cell to regulate mitosis. When these mechanisms fail, developmental problems or cancer are a likely outcome. The mechanism appears to be largely conserved throughout eukaryote species. 

The dynamics of mitosis are similar to a state machine. In a healthy cell, checkpoints between phases permit a new phase to  begin only when the previous phase is complete and successful.  At these checkpoints, gatekeeper molecules block or allow events, depending on their level of phosphorylation. Kinases are responsible for adding phosphate groups and phosphatases for removing them. Cyclins are molecules that manage the timing of cell cycle events. Cyclin dependent kinases pair up with cyclins to become operational.  Cyclins are named because they are created or destroyed at predetermined points within the cell cycle. Kinase inhibitors add another level of modulation. Kinase inhibitors are grouped into classes and are assigned not very descriptive acronyms. These include INKS for inhibitors of kinase, KIPS for kinase inhibitors and CKIPS for cyclin dependent kinases inhibitors. 

Scientists have used a variety of tools to unravel the role of hyperphosphorylation.  These include the study of knockout genes, the use of antibodies to block receptors on particular molecules, the use of temperature sensitive mutants, and microarrays to monitor the expression of particular genes. Yeast are a popular species for study because of the rapid cell cycle.  

Rb is one of the most studied checkpoint molecules.  It is so named because defects in Rb are linked to retinoblastoma. In its unphosphorylated state it blocks the transition from G0 or resting state to S or synthesis. It does this in at least 3 ways. It inhibits RNA synthesis, it prevents chromosomes from unwinding and it binds E2F, a factor needed for DNA synthesis. When it is hyperphosphorylated, Rb becomes inactive, releasing bound E2F and allowing phase S to proceed. 

Wee is a protein that operates at the G2 to metaphase checkpoint. Wee becomes active if errors occur in the DNA synthesis phase. It blocks entry into metaphase until the problem is resolved.  Like Rb, Wee becomes inactive when hyperphosphorylated. 

In contrast Mad1  is active when hyperphosphorylated. In its active state it is part of the checkpoint that blocks transition to anaphase. Cdc2, part of the metaphase entry checkpoint, is active depending on the pattern of phosphorylation.

Cell biology
Signal transduction
Post-translational modification
Phosphorus
Cell cycle